Yalchikayevo (Yalsıqay) is a rural locality (a village) in Taymasovsky Selsoviet, Kuyurgazinsky District, Bashkortostan, Russia. The population was 386 as of 2010. There are 4 streets.

Geography 
Yalchikayevo is located 38 km northwest of Yermolayevo (the district's administrative centre) by road. Lena is the nearest rural locality.

References 

Rural localities in Kuyurgazinsky District